The Metropolitan City of Florence is an administrative division called metropolitan city in the Tuscany region, Italy. Its capital is the city of Florence. It replaced the Province of Florence. It was first created by the reform of local authorities (Law 142/1990) and then established by the Law 56/2014. It has been operative since 1 January 2015.

Geography 
The Metropolitan City of Florence is bordered by the Metropolitan City of Bologna in the north, the province of Ravenna and Forlì-Cesena in the north-east, the province of Prato, Pistoia and Lucca in the north-west, the province of Pisa in the west, the province of Siena in the south and the province of Arezzo in the east and southeast.

Much of its territory lies in the plain of the Arno river and has thus become an exurban sprawl around the city of Florence. The northeastern part of the metropolitan city, in the Apennines, remains less developed. Romagna Granducale is the name given to the region lying on the northern slopes of Apennines. Corn, wine and silk are the chief products in the valley regions. Silk manufacturing was an important industry in the medieval times. Renaissance polymath Leonardo da Vinci was born in the village of Anchiano, which is a part of the Metropolitan City of Florence. The capital Florence is a well known cultural and a large tourist centre.

Main sights 
The Metropolitan City receives large number of tourists every year.

The capital city Florence has been recognised as UNESCO World Heritage Site. Some major tourist attractions of the city are Piazza del Duomo, Duomo of Santa Maria del Fiore, the Baptistery of  San Giovanni, Giotto's Bell Tower, the Loggia del Bigallo and Museo dell'Opera di Santa Maria del Fiore, Ponte Vecchio along with many others.

Sights in Barberino di Mugello include  Cattani Castle and Palazzo Pretorio. The Certosa del Galluzzo houses artworks by Pontormo. Giovanni Boccaccio's hometown Certaldo is home to the Palazzo Pretorio and Boccaccio’s House, while Vinci, birthplace of Leonardo da Vinci, houses a museum dedicated to the Italian polymath. Sesto Fiorentino is known for the Etruscan tomb “La Montagnola”.

Government

List of Metropolitan Mayors of Florence

Economy 
Wholesale and retail is the largest sector in the Metropolitan City: , almost 29% of the firms in the former Province of Florence were involved in it. Manufacturing, construction, real estate and agriculture are the next important ones with a percentage share of about 19.5%, 14%, 13.6% and 8% respectively.

Tourism is also an important industry. Empoli is known for its ancient glass-making industry.

References

See also 
 List of communes of the Metropolitan City of Florence

External links 
 

 
Florence
F
2015 establishments in Italy